Świerczów is a village in Namysłów County, Opole Voivodeship, in south-western Poland. It is the seat of the gmina (administrative district) called Gmina Świerczów.

References

Villages in Namysłów County